Xiaopu Town is a town and the county seat in the north central Jiangyong County, Hunan, China. Its seat is at Wuyi Rd.

References

Jiangyong
County seats in Hunan